The first inauguration of Gloria Macapagal Arroyo as the fourteenth President of the Philippines occurred on January 20, 2001, under extraordinary circumstances. The inauguration marked the commencement of the first term (which lasted three years five months and ten days) of Gloria Macapagal Arroyo as President, during the EDSA Revolution of 2001 following the removal of President Joseph Estrada.

Oath taking

At the time, Arroyo was the Vice President to President Joseph Estrada, the winner of the 1998 presidential election. Arroyo was one of those people called for the resignation of Estrada. Upon the news that Estrada had left Malacañang Palace and stepped down from office, Arroyo went to EDSA Shrine and took her oath of office as President. Chief Justice Hilario Davide, Jr. administered the oath of office. The Bible which she used was held by Cecilia Paz Abad, the youngest of daughter of then-Batanes Representative Florencio Abad.

Presidency of Gloria Macapagal Arroyo
Arroyo, Gloria
2001 in the Philippines
January 2001 events in the Philippines